Slobodan Popović (Cyrillic: Слободан Поповић; born 28 September 1962 in Inđija) is a Serbian former middle distance runner competing primarily in the 800 metres. He represented his country at the 1988 Summer Olympics and in the 1992 Summer Olympics.

International competitions

Personal bests
Outdoor
400 metres – 46.49 (Sarajevo 1987)
800 metres – 1:44.75 (Linz 1988) NR
1000 metres – 2:18.88 (London 1989) NR
Indoor
400 metres – 47.14 (Budapest 1988)
800 metres – 1:46.44 (Turin 1988) NR

References

All-Athletics profile

1962 births
Living people
People from Inđija
Yugoslav male middle-distance runners
Serbian male middle-distance runners
Olympic athletes of Yugoslavia
Olympic athletes as Independent Olympic Participants
Athletes (track and field) at the 1988 Summer Olympics
Athletes (track and field) at the 1992 Summer Olympics
World Athletics Championships athletes for Yugoslavia
Universiade medalists in athletics (track and field)
Universiade gold medalists for Yugoslavia
Medalists at the 1987 Summer Universiade